Unity Software Inc. (doing business as Unity Technologies) is a video game software development company based in San Francisco. It was founded in Denmark in 2004 as Over the Edge Entertainment (OTEE) and changed its name in 2007. Unity Technologies is best known for the development of Unity, a licensed game engine used to create video games and other applications.

History

Founding and early success (2004–2008) 
Unity Technologies was founded as Over the Edge Entertainment (OTEE) in Copenhagen in 2004 by David Helgason (CEO), Nicholas Francis (CCO), and Joachim Ante (CTO). Over the Edge released its first game, GooBall, in 2005. The game failed commercially, but the three founders saw value in the game development tools that they had created to simplify game development, and so they shifted the company's focus to create an engine for other developers.

The company sought to "democratize" game development and make development of 2D and 3D interactive content more accessible. Unity was named the runner-up for Best Use of Mac OS X Graphics at the 2006 Apple Design Awards. The company grew with the 2007 release of the iPhone, as Unity Technologies produced one of the first engines supporting the platform in full. Because the games industry was focused on console games when the iPhone and App Store were released, Unity was positioned to support developers looking to create mobile games. Its dominance on the iPhone was largely uncontested for a couple of years. In 2007, Over the Edge changed its name to Unity Technologies.

New platforms and expansion (2009–2019) 
The technology was developed for different platforms. By 2018, Unity was used to make games and other experiences for more than 25 platforms, including mobile, desktop, consoles, and virtual reality. Unity games can also be deployed on the Web.

The Unity Asset Store launched in November 2010 as an online marketplace for Unity users to sell project assets (artwork, code systems, audio, etc.) to each other.

In April 2012, Unity reportedly had 1 million registered developers, 300,000 of whom used Unity on a monthly basis. In May of the same year, a survey by Game Developer revealed that approximately 53% of mobile game developers were using Unity. By 2016, the company reported more than 5.5 million registered users. Part of Unity's appeal is that it allows people who lack the technical knowledge to program games from scratch to create games and other simulations.

Facebook integrated a software development kit for games using the Unity game engine in 2013. The kit featured tools that allowed tracking advertising campaigns and deep linking, where users were directly linked from social media posts to specific portions within games, and in-game-image sharing.

Unity acquired Applifier, a Helsinki-based mobile service provider, in March 2014. Applifier's game replay sharing and community service was initially called Everyplay, and became known as Unity Everyplay. The acquisition also meant that Applifier's mobile video ad network, GameAds, became Unity Ads. Two more acquisitions followed later in 2014: Playnomics, a data analysis platform for developers (now Unity Analytics), and Tsugi, whose continuous integration service became known as Unity Cloud Build.

In October 2014, Helgason announced in a blog post that he would be stepping down as CEO with John Riccitiello, the former CEO of game company Electronic Arts, replacing him. Helgason remained with the company as executive vice-president.

Software developer Niantic released Pokémon Go, which was built using Unity engine, in 2016. Following the success of Pokémon Go, Unity Technologies held several rounds of funding that increased the company's valuation: In July 2016, a $181 million round of funding valued the company at approximately $1.5 billion; in May 2017, the company raised $400 million that valued the company at $2.8 billion; and in 2018 Unity's CEO confirmed a $145 million round that valued the company at approximately $3 billion. Also in 2016, Facebook developed a new PC gaming platform with Unity. In 2017, Unity Technologies acquired Multiplay, a business that offers multiplayer server game hosting, from retailer Game for £19 million.

Unity Technologies released the Unity 2017 version of its platform in 2017. Unity worked with Google on ARCore in 2017 to develop augmented reality tools for Android devices and apps. The following year, Unity Technologies worked with Google Cloud to offer services for online game developers and Alphabet Inc. subsidiary DeepMind to develop virtual world artificial intelligence. The Unity platform is used to help machines through reinforced learning. According to Fast Company, DeepMind uses Unity software to train algorithms in "physics-realistic environments", where a computer will continually try to achieve a goal through trial and error.

The use of Unity Technologies software expanded beyond games in the 2010s, including film and television and automotive. For the automotive industry, carmakers use Unity's virtual reality platform for design and virtual world car testing simulations. In October 2018, Unity Technologies acquired Digital Monarch Media, a Canadian virtual cinematography company.

Unity Technologies created the Unity Icon Collective in November 2018. The team creates assets for sale in the Unity Asset Store for PC and consoles. The assets—characters, environments, art, and animation—can be used in high-quality games; the move was seen as an attempt to compete with Unity's rivals, such as Epic Games' Unreal Engine.

The company acquired Vivox, a cross-platform voice and text chat provider based in Framingham, Massachusetts, in January 2019. At an acquisition price of $123.4 million, the company became a wholly owned subsidiary of Unity Technologies and operates independently. Vivox's technology is used in Fortnite, PlayerUnknown's Battlegrounds, and League of Legends, among others. Terms of the deal were not disclosed. In May 2019, the company confirmed a $150 million Series E funding round that increased its valuation to $6 billion. In July that year, it announced that together with D1 Capital Partners, CPP Investment Board, Light Street Capital, Sequoia Capital and Silver Lake Partners, it would fund a $525 million tender to allow Unity's common shareholders to sell their shares in the company. Unity Technologies additionally purchased game analytics company deltaDNA in September 2019, which was later reported at a value of $53.1 million. The company continued their acquisitions by buying live game management platform ChilliConnect in October 2019, and 3D application streaming service Furioos creator Obvioos in November 2019. That same year, Unity paid $48.8 million to acquire Artomatix, a company that develops an AI-assisted material creation tool called ArtEngine. Despite growing revenues of $541.8 million, Unity also posted growing losses of $163.2 million.

The company's IPO filing revealed that they reported losses of over $162.3 million in 2019, and have consistently lost money since its founding in 2004. Despite the losses, the company has consistently grown in terms of revenue and employee numbers.

Going public and further acquisitions (2020–present) 
In June 2020, Unity announced that they had partnered with Apple to update the Unity Engine to run on Apple silicon-equipped Macs with the 2020.2 release, allowing game developers to update their games to support the new hardware platform. An Apple silicon-ported version of the Unity Editor was demoed during the WWDC 2020 Platforms State of the Union event. On 17 August of that year, Unity stated that it had acquired Codice Software, who make the distributed version control system Plastic SCM. That same year, Unity acquired Finger Food Advanced Technology Group for $46.8 million.

Unity announced its plans to offer an initial public offering (IPO) in August 2020. At the time, the company reported 1.5 million monthly users, with 15,000 new projects started daily.

In December 2020, Unity announced the acquisition of the multiplayer networking framework, MLAPI, and RestAR, a computer vision and deep learning company. In June 2021, it acquired Pixyz Software, a developer of 3D data optimization technology.

In a cash and shares deal Unity acquired Weta Digital for $1.63 billion in November 2021. Unity added the "Wellington-based company's 275 engineers to its workforce". The latter's visual special effects and animation teams "will continue to exist as a standalone entity", becoming Unity's "largest customer in the media and entertainment space". WetaFX remains majority owned by Peter Jackson.

In January 2022, Unity announced the acquisition of Ziva Dynamics, a Vancouver-based VFX company.

In March, they announced a partnership with Insomniac to create interactive online concerts and events.

In July 2022, Unity agreed to buy ironSource in an all-stock deal worth US$4.4 billion. On completion of the deal, Unity shareholders will own about 73.5% of the combined company and current IronSource shareholders will keep about 26.5%. Unity will also receive a $1 billion investment from Sequoia Capital and Silver Lake once the deal is closed.

In August 2022, AppLovin made an unsolicited offer to buy Unity in exchange for $17.54 billion in an all-stock deal. The proposed merger would result in the Unity CEO John Riccitiello becoming the CEO of the combined entity. AppLovin's bid excludes ironSource, that Unity agreed to buy in July. Later that month, Unity's board rejected the offer and committed to complete its acquisition of ironSource. The IronSource merger was completed in November 2022.

Corporate affairs 
Unity Technologies is a public company based in San Francisco, California; its IPO was in September 2020. , the company employed more than 2,000 people in offices across North America, Europe and Asia. It is overseen by a board of directors. John Riccitiello acts as chief executive officer (CEO), and replaced co-founder and former CEO David Helgason in 2014. Danny Lange, who has a history of work on machine learning for IBM, Microsoft, Amazon Web Services and Uber, is vice-president of artificial intelligence and machine learning, a post he has held since late 2016. Unity Technologies named its first independent directors in 2017. Riccitiello said the move was needed if the company intended to go public in the future. According to TechCrunch, Unity Technologies had raised more than $600 million in funding and was valued at about $3 billion by 2018. Its investors include Sequoia Capital, Draper Fisher Jurvetson, Silver Lake, China Investment Corporation, FreeS Fund, Thrive Capital, WestSummit Capital and Max Levchin. Revenue streams include licensing fees for its game engine, its Unity Asset Store, and the Unity platform.

Unity's business is split into Operate Solutions (consisting of Unity Ads, Unity In-App Purchases, and other tools, which was newly established in 2015), Create Solutions (consisting of Unity Engine subscriptions and other professional services) and Strategic Partnerships. In 2019, of its reported revenue Operate Solutions accounted for 54%, Create Solutions for 31% and the remaining income sources for 15%.

In 2017, Unity Technologies launched Unity Without Borders, a programme that sponsored 50 video game programmers from the Middle East to attend Unity's Unite Europe conference in Amsterdam. Unity Without Borders sponsored video game programmers affected by travel restrictions by President Donald Trump's administration. Unity also awards annual grants through its Unity for Humanity awards, given to creators building games and experiences using Unity’s real-time 3D technology.

On 5 June 2019, Anne Evans, formerly vice-president in human resources for Unity Technologies, filed a sexual harassment and wrongful termination lawsuit against the company. Unity Technologies responded that Evans had been terminated due to misconduct and lapse in judgment, and replaced Evans with a former Microsoft executive in mid-2020. On September 10, 2019, the Superior Court of California issued a court order granting Unity's motion to compel arbitration and stay all proceedings.

Unity announced it had reached net-zero carbon emissions in 2020, and simultaneously signed onto the Science Based Targets Initiative.

In January 2021, Unity hired former Liverpool CEO Peter Moore as SVP and GM of Sports and Live Entertainment.

Unity engine 

The engine originally launched in 2005 to create video games. Unity's eponymous platform is used to create two-dimensional, three-dimensional, virtual reality, and augmented reality video games and other simulations. 

As of 2017, Unity Technologies used its game engine to transition into other industries using the real-time 3D platform, including film and automotive. 

, it supports more than 25 platforms. The platform has been used to create approximately half of mobile games on the market and 60 percent of augmented reality and virtual reality content, including approximately 90 percent on emerging augmented reality platforms, such as Microsoft HoloLens, and 90 percent of Samsung Gear VR content. 

, Unity-made applications were used by 2 billion monthly active users, with 1.5 million monthly creators. Unity technology is the basis for most virtual reality and augmented reality experiences, and Fortune said Unity "dominates the virtual reality business". 

In September 2022, Unity launched new server-hosting and game matchmaking services as additions to Unity Software’s suite of tools.

See also 

 List of game engines

References

External links 
 

2004 establishments in Denmark
Video game companies based in California
Video game development companies
Video game companies established in 2004
Companies based in San Francisco
2020 initial public offerings
Companies listed on the New York Stock Exchange